Burke County High School is a public high school located in Waynesboro, Georgia, United States. The school is part of the Burke County School District, which serves Burke County.

In 2011, the Burke County Bears football team won the 3A state championship.

Notable alumni 
 Jonathan Broxton, professional baseball player (Los Angeles Dodgers, Kansas City Royals, Cincinnati Reds)
 Cornelius Washington, NFL football player (Chicago Bears)
 DaVonte Lambert, NFL football player (Tampa Bay Buccaneers), (Carolina Panthers)

References

External links

Burke County Public Schools

Schools in Burke County, Georgia
Public high schools in Georgia (U.S. state)